Bozhidar Dimitrov Andreev (Bulgarian: Божидар Димитров Андреев; born 17 January 1997) is a Bulgarian male weightlifter, and European Champion competing in the 77 kg category until 2018 and 73 kg starting in 2018 after the International Weightlifting Federation reorganized the categories.

In 2021, he represented Bulgaria at the 2020 Summer Olympics in Tokyo, Japan. He competed in the men's 73 kg event.

Career

World Championships
In 2018 the IWF restructured the weight classes and he competed in the newly created 73 kg division at the 2018 World Weightlifting Championships finishing in ninth place in the total.

European Championships
In 2019 he competed at the 2019 European Weightlifting Championships in the 73 kg division. He won a bronze medal in the snatch and won gold medals in the clean & jerk and total. His total of 345 kg being 6 kg over the reigning European Champion Briken Calja.

Other competitions
He won the 69 kg class at the 2014 Summer Youth Olympics.

Major results

References

External links

Living people
1997 births
Bulgarian male weightlifters
Weightlifters at the 2014 Summer Youth Olympics
Bulgarian people of Romani descent
World Weightlifting Championships medalists
Sportspeople from Sliven
Youth Olympic gold medalists for Bulgaria
European Weightlifting Championships medalists
Weightlifters at the 2020 Summer Olympics
Olympic weightlifters of Bulgaria
21st-century Bulgarian people